Jesse Royal Carmichael (born April 2, 1979) is an American musician, best known as the keyboardist and rhythm guitarist for the pop rock band, Maroon 5. He also has a solo project called 1863 and a side project titled Circuit Jerks.

Life and career
Carmichael was born to a Jewish family in Boulder, Colorado, United States. His father, Bob Carmichael, is a photographer, who also takes pictures during Maroon 5's tours. Jesse has a younger sister, Annie. He first started playing the guitar in junior high, rather than the keyboards (for which he is known in the band Maroon 5). Some time later, Carmichael, along with Adam Levine, Mickey Madden and Ryan Dusick, started a band called Kara's Flowers and signed a recording contract with Reprise Records. In 1997, they released their debut (and only) album, The Fourth World. The album found little success and, after the demise of the group, Carmichael and Levine attended Five Towns College. While in college, Carmichael began to play the keyboards. However, two years later, Levine and Carmichael dropped out and headed back to California.

The members of Kara's Flowers, along with guitarist James Valentine, went on to form Maroon 5 in 2001.

On March 9, 2012, Carmichael announced he would be taking a break from performing with Maroon 5, for an undetermined amount of time to focus more on his studies of "music and the healing arts".. During his hiatus, the band's touring keyboardist, PJ Morton was promoted to an official member and took over Carmichael's keyboard duties to fill-in for his absence.  However several months later, on October 10, 2012, Carmichael confirmed that he would be returning to the band after they completed their Overexposed Tour, expanding the group's membership to six after Morton's promotion. He rejoined in time for the band to record their fifth studio album V (2014).

Carmichael joined with musician and producer Jason Lader, and formed a side project titled Circuit Jerks and released the extended play titled EP1 on September 9, 2016.

Personal life
Carmichael’s father, Bob Carmichael is a professional photographer.

Carmichael lives with his wife and their son.

Discography

As a solo artist, 1863
 EP Four Songs (2012)

As a featured artist

Other albums, on which Carmichael has played
 Various Artists – Hoot: Original Motion Picture Soundtrack (2006)
 VietNam – VietNam (2007)
 Operation Aloha – Operation Aloha (2009)
 Brandi Carlile – Give Up the Ghost (2009)
 Jesse Harris – Music for Chameleons (2017)
 Allan Clarke and Graham Nash with Adam Levine and Paul Shaffer – The Rock & Roll Hall of Fame: In Concert 2010 & 2011 (2018)
 Jesse Harris – Aquarelle (2018)
 Claire Rosinkranz – Beverly Hills Boyfriend (2020)
 Morly – Til I Start Speaking (2021)

Filmography

Composer
 Thrive (2019) 
 Have You Heard About Greg? (2021)

References

External links
 Maroon 5 official website
 1863
 Circuit Jerks official website
 Bob Carmichael
 

1979 births
Living people
American rock keyboardists
American male singers
Planetshakers members
Maroon 5 members
Musicians from Boulder, Colorado
21st-century American keyboardists
21st-century American singers